Hillen is a surname. Notable people with the surname include:

Elsemiek Hillen (born 1959), Dutch field hockey player
Fritjof Hillén (1893–1977), Swedish footballer
Hans Hillen (born 1947), Dutch politician
Jack Hillen (born 1986), American ice hockey player
John Hillen (born 1966), American businessman
Michiel Hillen van Hoochstraten (c. 1476–1558), Flemish printer and publisher
Seán Hillen (born 1961), Irish artist
Solomon Hillen Jr. (1810–1873), American politician